Halmale or de/van Halmale is the name of a Flemish noble family, some people have been knighted. Notable persons with this name include:

 Hendrik van Halmale (1549–1640), bishop of Ypres
 Costen van Halmale (approx. 1432–1508), mayor of Antwerp